Simone Vagnozzi was the defending champion but decided not to participate.

Björn Phau claimed the title. He defeated Jan Hájek 6–4, 2–6, 6–3 in the final match.

Seeds

Draw

Finals

Top half

Bottom half

References
 Main Draw
 Qualifying Draw

Marburg Open - Singles
2011 Singles